Parliamentary elections were held in the Seychelles in 1967 for the Legislative Council of Seychelles. The Seychelles Democratic Party won four of the eight seats.

Results

References

Seychelles
Parliamentary
Elections in Seychelles
Election and referendum articles with incomplete results